The Azerbaijan national football team is the national football team of Azerbaijan and is controlled by Association of Football Federations of Azerbaijan. It represents Azerbaijan in international football competitions. The majority of Azerbaijan's home matches are held at the national stadium, Baku Olympic Stadium, with friendly matches sometimes hosted at club stadiums.

The Azerbaijan national football team has taken part in qualification for each major tournament since Euro 1996, but has never qualified for the finals tournament of any World Cup or European Championships. Despite this, Azerbaijan was the first Caucasus country to host a major tournament, the UEFA Euro 2020, even though the national side was the only host to be eliminated in the first round of qualifying.

History

Early period (before the 1920s)
In the early twentieth century, football began to become popular in Azerbaijan, which was then part of the Russian Empire. In 1912, Azerbaijani football players had their first "international match" and they won in Tbilisi, Georgia against the local "Sokol" team with 4:2. During 1912–1913, matches between Azerbaijani and Georgian football teams were organized, first in Tbilisi and then in Baku. In 1914, the Football Union was founded in Azerbaijan. The Football Union undertook the organization of official city championships and other competitions.

Soviet era (1920s–1991)
The oldest records of football teams in Soviet Azerbaijan goes back to 1926–1927, when Trans-Caucasian Championship was organized in Tbilisi. Three South Caucasian countries participated: Azerbaijan, Armenia and Georgia. The Azerbaijan national football team held its first friendly matches against Georgia and Armenia in 1927 for the Trans-Caucasian Championship in Georgia. Also in 1926, football players from Azerbaijan played three matches with Football team from Iran in Baku. In 1929, there were played three matches between these teams in Tehran. In all matches Azerbaijan players won.

The 1960s is considered the Golden Age for Azerbaijani football as it produced great players like Anatoliy Banishevskiy, Alakbar Mammadov and the football referee Tofiq Bahramov, most famous for being the linesman who helped to award a goal for England in the 1966 World Cup Final between England and West Germany.

Post-independence (1992–present)

1990s
After Azerbaijan gained its independence in 1991, AFFA — Association of Football Federations of Azerbaijan — was created. In 1992, renowned Azerbaijani footballer Alekper Mamedov became the first head coach of the Azerbaijani national football team, compiling a 3–1 record as coach that includes the first ever national team victory, over Georgia on May 25, 1993. In 1994, the national team was accepted into FIFA and UEFA. The security issues, forced the team to play all of its home Euro 96 qualifiers in Trabzon, Turkey.

2000s

As of the early 2000s, Azerbaijani football federation started to integrate more players to the national team through FIFA's eligibility rules. In February 2004, Carlos Alberto Torres, captain of the Brazil team that won the 1970 FIFA World Cup was appointed its national coach. Despite a poor start, a 0–6 defeat to Israel on February 18, Azerbaijan won their first ever away match, 3–2 against Kazakhstan on April 28. In June 2005, following a 3–0 defeat by Poland, Torres stood down from the position, to be replaced by former Neftchi coach Vagif Sadygov, his third spell as coach of Azerbaijan. Shahin Diniyev took over as manager in November 2005. He resigned on 31 October 2007, and Gjoko Hadzievski was named as care-taking coach of Azerbaijan.

In April 2008, former German football player and coach Berti Vogts was appointed as a manager of Azerbaijan on a two-year contract. Azerbaijan had a mixed qualifying campaign, finishing with 5 points, just missing out on a last place to Liechtenstein with 2 points.

In November 2009, AFFA extended Berti Vogts' contract a further two years, making him the first manager to manage the weak Azerbaijani national team in two qualification cycles.

2010s
In 2010, following a shock win over Turkey, the team reached 90th place in FIFA World Rankings, Azerbaijan's highest position ever in country's football history. After victory over Kazakhstan, Azerbaijan also broke their scoring and points records by gaining 7 points and scoring 10 goals.

In November 2011, AFFA extended Berti Vogts' contract a further two years, until the end of the 2014 FIFA World Cup qualification cycle. Under Vogts, Azerbaijan had some poor results, not being able to defeat second-string sides. Vogts faced major criticism, protest and demonstration from local supporters and the media. However, Azerbaijan managed to finish qualification cycle in fourth place, the team's best ever finish. In December 2013, Vogts being granted a new two-year contract, with aim to lead Azerbaijan through EURO 2016 qualifying. In July 2014, Azerbaijan beat its ranking record by reaching 73rd place in FIFA World Rankings. Following three straight losses, Vogts resigned from his post after spending six years in charge of Azerbaijan.

Succeeding Vogts as full-time manager was former Croatia international Robert Prosinečki. He guided the Azerbaijani team to another record points haul (10) in 2018 FIFA World Cup qualifying, but the team still finished fifth in the six-team Group C. Prosinečki resigned after deciding not to extend his contract with the Azerbaijan Football Federation and was succeeded by fellow countryman Nikola Jurčević.

2020s
The UEFA Euro 2020 qualifying proved to be a disaster for Azerbaijan as the team finished in bottom with a complete seven defeats and only one draw, which surprisingly, a draw against 2018 FIFA World Cup runners-up Croatia, the home of the manager. Nikola Jurčević departed following the poor performance of Azerbaijan.

Team image

Colours

As of UEFA Euro 2016 qualifying round, Azerbaijan's home colours are all-red kit. The team wears an all-blue kit for away games. This combination of colours is traditional for the national team since their first game. At the beginning of 90s, the team wore a white shirt, but towards the end of the decade it was transformed into blue-white striped shirts. At the beginning of the 2000s, the kit was replaced by the white shirt with a vertical tricolour stripe, formed of the colors from the national flag of Azerbaijan on the chest. The kit was changed into blue shirts, red shorts and green socks only for the UEFA Euro 2008 qualifying round. After the tournament, the national team went back to their usual combination of colours.

Azerbaijan national team's away colours were yellow-black striped shirts, black shorts and yellow socks until UEFA Euro 2004 qualifying round, when it was decided to abandon this kit in favor of the completely blue. During the UEFA Euro 2008 qualifying round games the team has used an all red kit.

Since 2017, Azerbaijan's kit has been supplied by Nike. They took over from Puma who were Azerbaijan's kit suppliers between 2004 and 2006. Before that Umbro were Azerbaijan's kit suppliers between 2002 and 2004.

Nickname
Azerbaijan is often referred to by the media and supporters as Milli (The National), which is the nickname associated with all of Azerbaijan's international sporting teams due to the team's utilization of the country's national colors.

Stadium

Most of Azerbaijan's home matches are played at the new Baku Olympic Stadium in Baku. It has been Azerbaijan's primary home stadium ever since the move from Tofiq Bahramov Stadium in 2015. Today, some qualifying matches and friendly matches are still hosted at the Tofiq Bahramov Stadium, whereas others are hosted at the Lankaran City Stadium, Bakcell Arena and Dalga Arena after it met UEFA stadium criteria.

Media coverage and public relations
Azerbaijan's matches are presently covered by the public channel İTV. 2014 FIFA World Cup qualification match rights were held by AZTV and Idman Azerbaijan TV.

AZTV, Idman Azerbaijan TV and Lider TV are among other networks that have previously shown live fixtures.

Kit suppliers

Results and fixtures

2022

2023

Coaching staff

Coaching staff

Players

Current squad
 The following players have been called up for the UEFA Euro 2024 qualifying matches.
 Match dates: 24 and 27 March 2023
 Opposition:  and 
 Caps and goals correct as of: 20 November 2022, after the match against 

Recent call-ups
The following players have been called up for the team within the last 12 months and are still available for selection.

INJ Withdrew due to injury
PRE Preliminary squad / standby
RET Retired from the national team
SUS Serving suspension
WD Player withdrew from the squad due to non-injury issue.
COV Withdrew after testing positive for COVID-19.

Player statistics

Players in bold are still active with Azerbaijan.

Most appearances

Top goalscorers

Competitive record
FIFA World Cup
 Champions   Runners-up   Third place   Fourth place  

UEFA European Championship
 Champions   Runners-up   Third place   Fourth place  

UEFA Nations League

Honours
 ECO Cup 1993 – Bronze 2009 UAE International Cup – Bronze Alma TV Cup – 2nd Place UEFA Nations League C'''
 2nd place: 2022–23

See also
 Azerbaijan national under-23 football team
 Azerbaijan national under-21 football team
 Azerbaijan national under-20 football team
 Azerbaijan national under-19 football team
 Azerbaijan national under-18 football team
 Azerbaijan national under-17 football team
 Association of Football Federations of Azerbaijan
 Azerbaijan Premier League

Notes

References

External links

 Azerbaycan Futbol Federasiyaları Assosiasiyası
 Azerbaijanifootball.com 
 Archive of international results 1979–2004 from Rec.Sport.Soccer Statistics Foundation
 UEFA match report on the first away win
 national-football-teams
 Azerbaijanisport
 Day.az
 Complete List of teams and results

 
European national association football teams
Football in Azerbaijan
National sports teams established in 1912
National
1912 establishments in the Russian Empire
1992 establishments in Azerbaijan